The Collingsworth Family is a Southern Gospel/Inspirational group started by Phil and Kim Collingsworth and features their family as the group. They are currently signed to gospel label Gaither Music Group. Phill and Kim have 4 Children (Brooklyn Rose), (Courtney Noel), (Phillip Jr.), and (Olivia Diane). Phill and Kim have 6 Grandchildren and is expecting the 7th in July of 2023. Emma, Winston, Theo, Noah, Wellington, and Mia. They travel around the United States to sing about Jesus!

History 
Phil and Kim both came from a Christian upbringing.  They met in high school and married upon graduating high school.  Kim recalls, “We had our first date when I was 16, and he was 21. Poor guy, he had to wait on me to grow up. We were so in love and really wanted to get married. So, I decided to cram four years of high school into three so I could graduate from high school in 1986. The same year he would graduate from college. That plan worked well.”

Ministry 
Phil and Kim Collingsworth started in the music ministry when they were musicians at a church camp in Petersburg, Michigan, in August of 1986. The two performed as a duo for 14 years, balancing gigs with raising children and Phil’s job at a life insurance agency. In 2000, they made the decision to tour full time. That’s also when their children — 10, 9, 6 and 2 at the time — became permanent members of the act.

Phil and Kim have provided music presentations for church camps and extended-length revival campaigns.  They have also held the positions of Minister of Music at Hobe Sound Bible Church in Hobe Sound, FL, and Director of the Music Division at Union Bible College and Seminary in Westfield, Indiana. Phil was Dean of Enrollment Management at his alma mater, God's Bible School and College, Cincinnati, Ohio.

Career 
The Collingsworths signed with Crossroads Entertainment and Marketing in 2003. In 2009, the Collingsworth Family signed with then new Christian label Stowtown Records.

In 2014, The Collingsworth Family recorded two live projects in Spartanburg, South Carolina. Majestic, a live CD and DVD from piano performer Kim Collingsworth and friends stemmed from a show in Spartanburg Memorial Auditorium with a crowd of more than 2,300 over a 5-hour concert. A DVD, We Will Serve the Lord, was released in October, 2014.

In 2018, they released their album Mercy and Love, a collection of covers and new songs.

The group's influence extends beyond the United States. In 2003, they performed in Kosovo, where more than 6,500 U.S. Army personnel heard their Christmas concerts at two military bases. In 2004, they gave a concert in the Cayman Islands.

Recognition 
The Collingsworth Family received the 2007 Harmony Award in the New Artist of the Year category from the Southern Gospel Music Guild. Their album The Best of The Collingsworth Family – Volume 1 was nominated for Best Roots Gospel Album in the 2018 Grammy Awards.

Discography

Albums

"Just Sing!" (November 2021)
"Worship From Home" (August 2020)
"A True Family Christmas" (October 2019)
"Mercy and Love" (Sept 2018)
"Brooklyn & Courtney" (January 2017)
"The Collingsworth Family Presents Brooklyn & Courtney"(Nov 2016)
"The Best of the Collingsworth Family Vol 1"(Sept 2016)
"The Best of the Collingsworth Family Vol 2"(Sept 2016)
"That Day Is Coming"(Sept 2015)
"Majestic" (Sept 2015)
"The Lord is Good"(Sept 2013)
"Hymns From Home"(Sept 2013)
"Feels Like Christmas" (Sept 2012)
"Part of the Family"(Sept 2011)
"Fear Not Tomorrow"(Sept 2010)
"A Decade of Memories"(September 2010)
"Simply Christmas" (Oct 2009)
"The Answer" (September 2009)
"Then and Now" (September 2009)
"Your Ticket to Music Hall"(August 2008)
"Kim Collingsworth, Personal"(August 2008)
"We Still Believe"(May 2007)
"Sunday Morning Ivories, Volume 2"(Sept 2006)
"God Is Faithful"(September 2005)
"Christmas in Kosovo"(September 2004)
"Strength for the Journey"(November 2003)
"I’m Too Far"(April 2002)
"Silver & Ivory (Instrumental)"(April 2001)
"Sunday Morning Ivories"(Nov 2000)
"Lifting Our Voices"(April 2000)

Videos
"That Day Is Coming"(Sept 2017)
"Majestic" (Sept 2014)
"We Will Serve the Lord"(Sept 2014)
"Hymns from Home"(Sept 2013)
"Feels Like Christmas" (Sept 2012)
"Part of the Family"(Sept 2012)
"Fear Not Tomorrow"(Sept 2010)
"A Decade of Memories"(September 2010)
"Kim Controlling ‘PERSONAL’"(August 2008)
"Your Ticket to Music Hall"(August 2008)
"A Night to Remember" (September 2006)
"We Have Met to Worship"(September 2004)
"Christmas in Kosovo"(September 2004)
"One Special Evening"(November 2002)

Top 10 Songs
Awesome Power of Prayer #9
Mercy and Love #8
What The Bible Says #6
How Great His Love For Me #9
Just Another Rainy Day #4

Awards and nominations

Grammy Awards

GMA Dove Awards

Singing News Fan Awards

NQC Music Awards

Ovation Awards

Harmony Awards

References

External links 
 

Family musical groups
Southern gospel performers
Musical groups established in 2006